Michael Richard Balenti (July 3, 1886August 4, 1955) was a Major League Baseball shortstop and left fielder who played 70 games for the Cincinnati Reds and the St. Louis Browns in 1911 and 1913, respectively.

His maternal grandfather, Charles Rath, was the namesake of Rath City, Texas. Balenti's mother was born of Charles Rath's marriage to a Cheyenne woman named Making-Out-Roads. Balenti himself was born of his mother's marriage to a Hungarian immigrant. Charles Rath's later marriage to a white woman bore him a son named Morrie Rath, against whom Balenti played in the American League without knowing they were related.

Balenti married an Alaska Native, Cecilia Baronovich, who he met while attending Carlisle Indian School. They lived among the Cheyenne in Oklahoma part-time and among Cecilia's people in Alaska during the offseasons. On at least one occasion it took Balenti two months to travel from his minor league club's home in Chattanooga to his offseason home in Alaska. After retirement, he worked in construction in Altus, Oklahoma.

Head coaching record

References

External links
 
 

1886 births
1955 deaths
American football quarterbacks
American people of Cheyenne descent
American people of Hungarian descent
Baseball players from Oklahoma
Blackwell Gassers players
Carlisle Indians baseball players
Carlisle Indians football players
Chattanooga Lookouts players
Chattanooga Mocs football coaches
Chattanooga Mocs athletic directors
Cincinnati Reds players
Galveston Pirates players
Macon Peaches players
Major League Baseball shortstops
Minor league baseball managers
People from Canadian County, Oklahoma
Players of American football from Oklahoma
San Antonio Bronchos players
Savannah Indians players
Texas A&M Aggies baseball players
El Reno Packers players